William Peden Dunlop (11 August 1874 – 28 November 1941) was a Scottish footballer who played for Liverpool in the late 19th and early 20th centuries, earning two Football League championship medals. Dunlop played once for Scotland, in 1906.

Life and playing career
Dunlop played for Sandyford, Hurlford, Kilmarnock and Abercorn in Scotland before being signed by Liverpool managers John McKenna and William Barclay in January 1895 for £35. He made his Liverpool debut in a Football League First Division match a 3–2 home defeat at the hands of Sunderland on the 25 March 1895, a season which saw Liverpool relegated from the top flight. The left sided full-back would have enjoyed his second season a bit more as Liverpool gained promotion straight back to the First Division in 1895–96. Dunlop's early appearances for the Reds were sporadic but his loyalty and dedication paid off as he was to become a regular starter over a 10-year period which included the Anfield club's first ever Football League Championship win in 1900–01, a feat they were to repeat in 1905–06 (after another relegation in 1903–04 followed by promotion 1904–05 in a turbulent period). Dunlop scored just twice for Liverpool, his first coming on the 19 September 1903 in a 1–1 draw with Stoke at Anfield.

Having earlier been overlooked despite a strong performance in the Home Scots v Anglo-Scots trial match in 1901, Dunlop earned one international cap when he represented Scotland against England on 7 April 1906, a game Scotland won 2–1 in a British Home Championship fixture at Hampden Park, Glasgow. Dunlop's Liverpool teammate Alex Raisbeck also played in the match, captaining the Scots.

He later worked for Sunderland for three decades as a trainer and masseur until his death in 1941.

Honours
Liverpool
Football League Champions: 1900–01, 1905–06
Football League Second Division: 1895–96, 1904–05

References

External links
LFCHistory.net profile

1874 births
1941 deaths
Kilmarnock F.C. players
Liverpool F.C. players
Scottish footballers
Scotland international footballers
Abercorn F.C. players
Association football fullbacks
Footballers from Kilmarnock
Scottish Football League players
English Football League players
Association football coaches
Association football physiotherapists
Sunderland A.F.C. non-playing staff